Flashpoint is a 1998 adult film starring Jenna Jameson as a horny firefighter. It is the highest-selling adult film of all time.

The film was re-released as Flashpoint X to commemorate its 10th anniversary.

Flashpoint was shot on a budget of $220,000, making it one of the ten biggest budget adult films of all time.

Awards
 1999 AVN Award – Best Overall Marketing Campaign (Individual Title or Series)
 1999 Hot d'Or Award – Best American Movie

References

External links
 
 
 
 Editor's Choice: Flashpoint
 "Up In Smoke Planet Hollywood Cancels Flashpoint Premiere; 'Anonymous Caller' Reportedly to Blame"
 "Wicked's Flashpoint Hits #1 on Adult DVD Empire Chart: Company releases 10th anniversary edition"
 "Wicked Discontinues Flashpoint DVD, Preps Special Edition"

1998 films
American pornographic films
1990s pornographic films
1990s American films